Hamilton is an unincorporated community with a U.S. Post Office in Moffat County, Colorado, United States.  The Hamilton Post Office has the ZIP Code 81638.

Geography
Hamilton is located at  (40.364073,-107.616577).

References

Unincorporated communities in Moffat County, Colorado
Unincorporated communities in Colorado